A carajillo is a hot coffee drink to which a hard liquor is added. It is typical of Spain and several Latin American countries, such as Colombia, where it is usually made with brandy, Cuba, where it is usually made with rum, and some areas of Mexico, mezcal or a coffee liqueur such as Kahlúa or Tía María. Carajillo is usually served in a small glass.

According to folk etymology, its origin dates to the times when Cuba was a Spanish province. The troops combined coffee with rum to give them courage. In Catalan, the carajillo is called . A similar Italian drink is known as caffè corretto.

Preparation 
There are many different ways of making a carajillo, ranging from an espresso with the spirit simply poured in, to heating the spirit with lemon, sugar and cinnamon and adding the coffee last.

Although the carajillo is known throughout Spain, the exact way to prepare a carajillo varies slightly in each region of the Spanish country. In Catalonia, for example, it is usually presented in its most simplistic form of coffee with brandy (unburned) and with the sugar on the side, so that the consumer can add it to his or her taste. In the province of Castellón, on the other hand, the preparation is usually a little more elaborate, because it is normal to heat and partially burn the alcohol in the glass, along with the sugar, cinnamon, coffee beans and a piece of lemon rind. This version is also often preferred by cocktail bars and high-class restaurants when a more luxurious (and more expensive) version is required.

A Spanish 'typical recipe' might involve combining three parts of coffee with one part brandy (or other distillate). First, the liquor is heated, to which a few coffee beans, a lemon rind and the sugar are added. Some people also include a small piece of cinnamon stick. The whole is then set on fire and stirred until the alcohol has been reduced a little and the aromas have been enhanced and mixed. It is then extinguished by covering it with a small saucer of coffee. In the meantime, prepare a glass of coffee. The last step is to put everything together in this glass and serve it very hot. If the alcohol is poured first and the coffee is poured not directly but first over the back of a spoon, the liquids are not mixed since they have different densities.

The American version uses a heated sugar-rimmed Spanish coffee mug with  rum and  triple sec.

In Mexico carajillos are usually made with espresso (or some other type of strong coffee) and "Licor 43" – a sweet vanilla-citrus flavored liquor – and poured over ice on a short glass. It is commonly drunk as a digestive after meals.

See also

References

 Romaní i Olivé, Joan Maria: Diccionari del vi i del beure. Edicions de La Magrana, col·lecció Pèl i Ploma, núm. 21. Barcelona, desembre del 1998. , plana 63.
 Costa, Roger «Quin és l'origen del popular 'carajillo' i del seu nom?». Sàpiens [Barcelona], núm. 71, setembre 2008, p. 5. .
 «Rebentats, rasques, brufar» (en ca). RodaMots. [Consulta: 3 agost 2017]. «S’usa «rebentar el cafè», per exemple: «Aquest cafè el podríem rebentar amb un poc de conyac». Un avantatge, per petit que sigui, sobre el castellà, el qual, que jo sàpiga, no pot dir «vamos a carajillar este café».»

Spanish drinks
Alcoholic coffee drinks